There are four theatres called Slovensko narodno gledališče (SNG):

Ljubljana Slovene National Theatre Drama
Ljubljana Slovene National Theatre Opera and Ballet
Maribor Slovene National Theatre
Nova Gorica Slovene National Theatre